In quantum error correction, CSS codes, named after their inventors, Robert Calderbank, Peter Shor 
and Andrew Steane, are a special type of stabilizer code constructed from classical codes with some special properties. An example of a CSS code is the Steane code.

Construction 

References

External links 

Linear algebra
Quantum information science